Marcel Bernard Tremblay (July 4, 1915 – March 20, 1980) was a Canadian professional ice hockey right winger who played 10 games in the National Hockey League for the Montreal Canadiens in 1938-39. He was buried in Mobile, Alabama, having died on March 20, 1980.

Tremblay had played for several years with the senior Flin Flon Bombers, when he signed with the Montreal Canadiens organization in 1938. He was assigned to the New Haven Eagles, but played ten games for the Canadiens that season. He returned to New Haven and played with the team until 1942 when a fractured skull ended his season. Tremblay enlisted in the military and did not play professionally again.

External links 

1915 births
1980 deaths
People from Saint Boniface, Winnipeg
Ice hockey people from Winnipeg
Montreal Canadiens players
Winnipeg Monarchs players
Canadian ice hockey right wingers